Club Deportivo Huracán Melilla is a Spanish football team based in Melilla. Founded in 2020, they play in Tercera Federación – Group 9, holding home games at Estadio La Espiguera, which has a capacity of 2,000 spectators.

Season to season

1 season in Tercera Federación

References

External links
BDFutbol team profile
Soccerway team profile

Football clubs in Melilla
Association football clubs established in 2020
2020 establishments in Spain